Denis Firago (born 20 November 2000) is a Belarusian professional footballer.

References

External links 
 
 

2000 births
Living people
Belarusian footballers
Association football forwards
FC Isloch Minsk Raion players
FC Molodechno players